Calogero Firetto, commonly referred to as Lillo Firetto, is an Italian politician.

He is a member of the centrist party Union of the Centre and served as Mayor of Porto Empedocle from 2006 to 2015. Firetto was elected Mayor of Agrigento at the 2015 Italian local elections supported by both centre-right and centre-left parties. He took office as mayor on 3 June 2015.

He ran for a second term at the 2020 elections, but lost to the civic candidate Francesco Miccichè.

See also
2015 Italian local elections
List of mayors of Agrigento

References

External links
 

1965 births
Living people
Mayors of Agrigento
Union of the Centre (2002) politicians
University of Palermo alumni